Fauna is a 2020 Mexican-Canadian drama film, directed by Nicolás Pereda. An exploration of the impact of "narco" culture on Mexican society, the film stars Luisa Pardo and Francisco Barreiro as Luisa and Paco, a couple who are travelling to visit her parents when they are reunited with Luisa's estranged brother Gabino (Lázaro Gabino Rodríguez).

An excerpt from the film was screened as part of the "Works in Progress" section of the Los Cabos International Film Festival in 2019, and won the Cinecolor Mexico Award. The completed film premiered at the 2020 Toronto International Film Festival, where it received an honorable mention from the jury for the Amplify Voices award for Best Canadian Film.

The film was named to TIFF's year-end Canada's Top Ten list for feature films.

References

External links
 
 

2020 films
2020 drama films
Spanish-language Canadian films
Canadian drama films
Mexican drama films
Films directed by Nicolás Pereda
2020s Canadian films